Kovno Kollel also known as Kollel Perushim of Kovno or Kollel Knesses Beis Yitzchok, was a kollel located in Kaunas, Lithuania. It was founded in 1877 by Rabbi Yisrael Lipkin Salanter when he was 67.

Kovno Kollel's purpose was the furtherance of hora'ah (expertise in deciding matters of Jewish law) and musar - by supporting and guiding exceptional Torah scholars in their development as authorities.

History
In 1877, Rabbi Yisroel ben Ze’ev Wolf Lipkin – also known as Yisroel Salanter – founded a Kollel (a yeshiva for young, mostly married, men) in the city of Kaunes (Kovno), Lithuania.

The purpose of this Kollel was to teach aspiring scholars the ways of the Musar movement (of which Lipkin was the founder), a non-Hasidic Orthodox movement that sought to emphasize ethical conduct and spiritual devotion.

The project received the blessings, and eventually the name, of the Kovno Rav and posek hador (the generation's outstanding authority in Jewish law), Rabbi Yitzchak Elchanan Spektor, the rabbi of Kovno.

Over the course of several decades the Kovno Kollel grew in size as well as reputation and came to be closely associated with the Musar movement – all of which was possible in a city with as vibrant a Jewish community as that which was found in Kovno before the Second World War. 

When the Nazis invaded and occupied Kovno the Kollel suffered the same tragic fate as most of the city’s Jewish residents.

Innovations
Until 1877, yeshivas only subsidized students until they got married (at an early age). Rabbi Salanter  instituted the practice of paying a small salary to married students to continue their advanced Talmudical studies. He defended this innovation because he said that he was training leaders. His argument was that the need for well-trained communal leaders mandated this drastic action. The justification was that these individuals would eventually serve the community, and it was not that because they sat and learned that they should be supported.

By 1877-1878, ten scholars had begun their full-time studies, following a curriculum which included the study of musar literature. In 1879, Rabbi Spektor became its head. Rabbi Nosson Tzvi Finkel served as the mashgiach of the kollel.  Rabbi Spektor's son, Rabbi Zvi Hirsh Rabinowitz accepted the administrative responsibilities and was one of the roshei kollel (heads of the kollel), while Rabbi Avrohom Shenker and Rabbi Finkel conducted the internal affairs. Under the latter's guidance, the book Eitz Pri was published, featuring essays by Rabbis Salanter and Spektor - including a foreword by the then lesser-known Rabbi Yisroel Meir HaKohen (the "Chafetz Chaim").

In 1880, Finkel left the kollel so he could devote himself to establishing more kollelim throughout Eastern Europe. In 1880, Spektor also left the Kollel, and Salanter's student Yitzchak Blazer became its new head.  Under Blazer's direction, the kollel came to be "considered by its contemporaries as a bastion of the Mussar movement," and was attacked by the Mussar movement's opponents.

The Kovno Kollel was later transferred to Slabodka, a suburb of Kovno, where Rabbi Shimon Zvi Dubiansky was appointed rosh kollel and served there until the outbreak of World War II.

Chavrei kollel (Kollel members)
 Rabbi Yosef Yozel Horwitz
 Rabbi Yaakov Kamenetsky
 Rabbi Dovid Leibowitz
 Rabbi Chaim Rabinowitz
 Rabbi Shmuel Leib Svei (father of Rabbi Elya Svei)

See also 
 Yitzchak Isaac Sher#Slabodka Kollel

References

Educational institutions established in 1877
History of Kaunas
Kollelim
Yeshivas of Lithuania
Musar movement
1877 establishments in the Russian Empire